Licenciado Gustavo Díaz Ordaz International Airport (sometimes abbreviated as Lic. Gustavo Díaz Ordaz International Airport)  is an international airport in Puerto Vallarta, Jalisco, Mexico. The airport is named after President Gustavo Díaz Ordaz (1964–70), and had a total of 4.1 million passengers during 2021 and 6.2 million during 2022. It is listed as the 7th busiest airport in Mexico in terms of passenger movement for the 2010s decade.

Overview

Licenciado Gustavo Díaz Ordaz International Airport is mainly a tourist airport, with most passengers visiting the airport in the winter, spring and early summer, just before the rainy season hits the area. The airport serves multiple destinations in North America, and the British tourist airline TUI Airways serves the airport with one weekly year-round flight to Manchester using their Boeing 787 aircraft. Los Angeles, Dallas, and Phoenix are the busiest international routes from the airport, serving more than 130 thousand passengers annually. Among all airlines that serve the airport, WestJet serves the greatest number of international destinations, connecting 11 different Canadian cities with Puerto Vallarta during the high season.

The terminal building has two floors, and is divided into two halls: Halls A and B. The first floor contains the check-in area, the international arrivals area, and some food areas. The upper floor has abundant food services and shopping areas, along with the security checkpoint, a VIP Lounge, duty-free shops, and the departures area. Hall A is for domestic traffic, while Hall B is for international traffic.

Expansion and growth

Puerto Vallarta and the Riviera Nayarit area has seen growth and expansion due to higher demand. In the 21st century, multiple airlines have expanded at the airport, along with new airlines and aircraft upgrades.

In 2020, it has been announced that the Grupo Aeroportuario del Pacífico operator group have invested about $4 billion pesos to build a 35,000-square-meter non-energy terminal, which would increase passenger traffic by 60% after completion. In addition, the funds will also be used for a new bus terminal and improved parking lots. This is part of GAP's new expansion plan for its airports in the state of Jalisco, spending a total of $18 billion pesos, and is expected to be completed by 2024.

Airlines and destinations

Passenger

Statistics

Passengers

Busiest routes

Note

See also 

List of the busiest airports in Mexico

References

External links 

 Puerto Vallarta International Airport
 http://weather.noaa.gov/weather/current/MMPR.html Current weather at MMPR from NOAA
 TripAdvisor page on arrival at PVR, including warning about the Shark Tank.

Airports in Jalisco
Puerto Vallarta
WAAS reference stations